Woodwell Climate Research Center, formerly known as the Woods Hole Research Center (WHRC) until August 2020, is a scientific research organization that studies climate change impacts and solutions. The International Center for Climate Governance named WHRC the world's top climate change think tank for 2013, 2014, 2015, and 2016.

Woodwell conducts research on the causes and impacts of climate change throughout the tropics, the Arctic, and North America. The Center designs all of its work to inform policy or answer policy questions and is composed of six core units: Arctic, Carbon, Risk, Tropics, Water, and Impact.

History 
The Woods Hole Research Center was established in 1985 in Woods Hole, Massachusetts by George Woodwell. WHRC was one of the first organizations dedicated to fighting global climate change and Woodwell testified to Congress in 1986 about the dangers of sea level rise and global warming.

The plan for developing the United Nations Framework Convention on Climate Change was drafted at the Woods Hole Research Center in the late 1980s by Woodwell and Kilaparti Ramakrishna. In 2005, Dr. John P. Holdren became the director and he continued to lead the organization until he was appointed as President Obama's science advisor in 2009.  Holdren returned to WHRC as a senior advisor in 2017 after President Obama left office.

In 2020, the Center was renamed to the Woodwell Climate Research Center to emphasize the scientific focus on climate change and honor the founder, George Woodwell.

The organization's current president is Dr. Philip Duffy, a physicist who was formerly the White House National Science and Technology Council’s Senior Advisor to the U.S. Global Change Research Program. Woodwell Climate has about 80 staff members. 

The Center's Gilman Ordway Campus, located on Cape Cod in the town of Falmouth, was completed in 2004. The  building is composed of a renovated summer estate (ca. 1874) and a new wing. The campus is energy neutral, with renewable power generated by a 100 kW wind turbine, as well as rooftop photo-voltaic power systems.

Awards 
The International Center for Climate Governance has named Woodwell as the world's top climate change think tank for four years in a row—2013, 2014, 2015, and 2016. The award is based on quantitative and analytical data, including activities, publications and dissemination.

References

External links
Woodwell Climate Research Center official site

Environmental research institutes
Research institutes in Massachusetts
Education in Barnstable County, Massachusetts
Falmouth, Massachusetts
Environmental organizations based in Massachusetts
Environmental organizations established in 1985
Research institutes established in 1980
1985 establishments in Massachusetts
Science and technology in Massachusetts